Landscheid (Luxembourgish: Laaschent) is a village in northeastern Luxembourg.

It is situated in the commune of Tandel and has a population of 109.

References 

Villages in Luxembourg